The Italdesign Zerouno is a sports car produced by Italian Automotive styling house Italdesign Giugiaro and was introduced in 2017. The Zerouno is the first car sold under the name of the Moncalieri design house and was created by their Italdesign Automobili Speciali division. The name means "Zero One", as it is the first production vehicle from Italdesign's low production sports car division, Italdesign Automobili Speciali.

Production 

The Zerouno coupé was introduced in 2017 at the Geneva Motor Show and had a limited production run of 5 units, all of which, according to the company, have been sold. The coupé had a base price of US$1.7 million. The Zerouno Duerta (roadster) was introduced at the 2018 Geneva Motor Show and is also limited to 5 cars.

Specifications and performance 

The car is powered by the mid-mounted 5.2 litre naturally aspirated V10 engine (used in the Audi R8 and Lamborghini Huracán) and produces 602 hp (449 kW; 610 PS) at 8,250 rpm and 520 Nm (383.5 lb ft) of torque at 6,500 rpm, with power going to all four wheels through a seven-speed dual-clutch transmission. The Zerouno uses a modular carbon fibre and aluminium chassis and has body work made of carbon fibre.

References 

Italdesign vehicles
Cars introduced in 2017
Rear mid-engine, all-wheel-drive vehicles